Lamine Traoré (born 10 June 1982) is a Burkinabé former professional footballer who played as a centre-back for Anderlecht and Gençlerbirligi.

He was part of the Burkina Faso national team at the 2004 African Nations Cup, which finished bottom of its group in the first round of competition, thus failing to secure qualification for the quarter-finals.

External links

Player profile at FIFA

Living people
1982 births
Burkinabé footballers
Association football central defenders
Burkina Faso international footballers
2002 African Cup of Nations players
2004 African Cup of Nations players
Belgian Pro League players
Süper Lig players
Planète Champion players
R.S.C. Anderlecht players
Gençlerbirliği S.K. footballers
Burkinabé expatriate footballers
Burkinabé expatriate sportspeople in Turkey
Expatriate footballers in Turkey
Burkinabé expatriate sportspeople in Belgium
Expatriate footballers in Belgium
21st-century Burkinabé people